Tobin Township is one of seven townships in Perry County, Indiana, United States. As of the 2010 census, its population was 768 and it contained 418 housing units.

History
Several members of the Tobin family were among the pioneer settlers who arrived to Tobin Township in the 1810s.

The crash of Northwest Orient Airlines Flight 710, which killed 63 people on March 17, 1960 occurred in Tobin Township.

The Old Perry County Courthouse was listed on the National Register of Historic Places in 1981.

Geography

Unincorporated towns
 Dodd at 
 Gerald at 
 Hardingrove at 
 Lauer at 
 Rome at 
 Tobinsport at 
(This list is based on USGS data and may include former settlements.)

Cemeteries
The township contains these twenty cemeteries: Brashear, Bryant, Carr, Cockrell-Tate, Conner, Connor, Cooks, David Tate, George Tate, German Ridge, Gilliand, Groves, Harding, Hiley, Lamb, Lamb, Lower Cummings, Maier, Miller, Robinson, Saint Johns, Saint Peters, Sampley,  Schraner, Seibert, Shoemaker, Simons, Smith, Tate, Upper Cummings and Wegenast.

School districts
 Perry Central Community School Corporation

Political districts
 State House District 74
 State Senate District 47

References
 
 United States Census Bureau 2009 TIGER/Line Shapefiles
 IndianaMap

External links
 Indiana Township Association
 United Township Association of Indiana
 City-Data.com page for Tobin Township

Townships in Perry County, Indiana
Townships in Indiana